Jerry Ellis may refer to:
Jerry Ellis (author) (born 1947), American author
Jerry Ellis (Oklahoma politician) (born 1946), Oklahoma State Senator
Jerry Ellis (Washington politician), Washington State Representative
Jerry Ellis, founder of Building 19, a chain of discount stores in New England

See also
Gerry Ellis (born 1957), American football player